William Rae is a former Scottish footballer. Rae played six matches for Hamilton Academical in the 1966–1967 season.

References

Hamilton Academical F.C. players
Partick Thistle F.C. players
Scottish footballers
Living people
Kilsyth Rangers F.C. players
Scottish Football League players
Association football wingers
Year of birth missing (living people)